Md. Mashiur Rahman is a Bangladeshi academic and Vice-Chancellor of National University, Bangladesh. In September 2022, the government broke the trustee board of Manarat International University and created a new board which included Rahman.

Early life 
Rahman was born in Nalchity Upazila, Jhalokathi District. did his undergraduate and graduate studies in sociology from the University of Dhaka. He his doctorate and post doctorate work from Lund University.

Career 
Rahman started teaching at the Department of Sociology of the University of Chittagong. He later joined the sociology department at the University of Dhaka. He went on to become a professor at the department.

On 10 May 2017, Rahman was appointed Pro-Vice Chancellor of the National University.

Rahman was appointed the Vice-Chancellor of the National University on 30 May 2021 replacing Harun-or-Rashid.

References 

Living people
University of Dhaka alumni
Academic staff of the University of Dhaka
Lund University alumni
Academic staff of the University of Chittagong
Bangladeshi sociologists
1973 births
People from Jhalokati district